Thespesius was a martyr, who died during the persecutions of Emperor Severus Alexander. His name is Greek for "Wondrous One".

References

230 deaths
Saints from Roman Anatolia
3rd-century Christian martyrs
Year of birth unknown